German submarine U-1224 was a Type IXC/40 U-boat of Nazi Germany's Kriegsmarine built for service during World War II. She was constructed by Deutsche Werft of Hamburg, used as a training ship for Japanese sailors, and transferred into Japanese service on 15 February 1944. In the Imperial Japanese Navy, she served as Ro-501 until sunk on 13 May 1944.

Design
German Type IXC/40 submarines were slightly larger than the original Type IXCs. U-1224 had a displacement of  when at the surface and  while submerged. She had two shafts and two  propellers.

U-1224 was fitted with six  torpedo tubes (four fitted at the bow and two at the stern), 22 torpedoes, one  SK C/32 naval gun, 180 rounds, and a  Flak M42 as well as two twin  C/30 anti-aircraft guns. The boat had a complement of forty-eight.

FLAK weaponry
U-1224/Ro-501 was mounted with a single 3.7 cm Flakzwilling M43U gun on the LM 42U mount. The LM 42U mount was the most common mount used with the 3.7 cm Flak M42U. The 3.7 cm Flak M42U was the marine version of the 3.7 cm Flak used by the Kriegsmarine on Type VII and Type IX U-boats.

Service history

Kriegsmarine
The submarine's keel was laid down on 30 November 1942 by Blohm & Voss of Hamburg. It was commissioned on 20 October 1943.

U-1224 was used as a training ship for Japanese sailors, and engaged in technology transfer activities. It began its career doing training for Japanese sailors who had arrived as part of the Yanagi missions. A small crew of Kriegsmarine sailors trained 48 Japanese sailors at sea in the Baltic from October 1943 until February 1944.

Imperial Japanese Navy
After the crew underwent three months of training, U-1224 was recommissioned into the Imperial Japanese Navy as Ro-501. Captain Narita was put in charge of the crew, and Ro-501 was then tasked to carry a load of war materials, blueprints, and other secret cargo from Kiel, Germany to Penang, Malaysia. The mission was never completed.

Technology Transfer
Germany and Japan were separated by great distance, and by 1944 they were increasingly cut off from each other. While neither power was able to send meaningful reinforcements or armaments through territory controlled by the Allied powers, they were able to use submarines to share some intelligence and weapons blueprints. Submarines offered security and their stealth allowed for a fair chance of success. Between 1942 and 1944, approximately 35 submarines attempted the journey from Europe to the Far East, and at least 11 attempted the journey from the Far East to Europe.

On its journey from Germany to Malaysia, Ro-501 carried precious metals, uncut optical glass, models and blueprints necessary to construct a Type IX U-boat in addition to motors and blueprints for the Messerschmitt Me 163 "Komet” rocket fighter airplane. It was also hoped that the trained Japanese sailors would pass along their expertise.

Sinking
The intended route to Penang was to take Ro-501 through the middle of the Atlantic Ocean west of the Azores and the Cape Verde islands, then around the Cape of Good Hope. She was to rendezvous with I-8 in the Indian Ocean to refuel before proceeding to her destination. The group's presence forced Ro-501 underwater for two days, during which her batteries were depleted and her captain radioed a coded signal that he was being pursued. This transmission was detected by the American ships with their high-frequency direction finding ("Huff-Duff") equipment, enabling them to pinpoint the submarine's location.

The Francis M. Robinson reported a submerged contact at 19:00 on 13 May 1944. The destroyer escort engaged the contact with a full salvo from its forward-throwing Hedgehog mount, followed by five salvos of magnetic proximity fuzed depth charges. Four underwater explosions were detected. All 56 hands aboard were lost - 52 crew (including a German radar operator and a German pilot) plus four IJN officer passengers.

This is a few miles from where  sank .

References

Bibliography

External links
 Wreck information for the RO-501
 German Sub Losses 

 Blockade Running Information, WW2

German Type IX submarines
U-boats commissioned in 1944
World War II submarines of Germany
World War II submarines of Japan
1943 ships
Ships built in Hamburg
U-boats sunk in 1944
U-boats sunk by US warships
U-boats sunk by depth charges
Foreign submarines of the Imperial Japanese Navy
Ships lost with all hands
Maritime incidents in May 1944
World War II shipwrecks in the Atlantic Ocean